The Dr. William Frederick Wittwer House, in Los Lunas, New Mexico, was built in 1904. It was listed on the National Register of Historic Places in 1987. It is located on New Mexico State Road 6, just west of U.S. Route 85.

It was home of a medical doctor who served the area for more than 60 years, often as the only doctor there, until his death at age 93, in 1965. His efforts eliminated pellagra in the area, which was previously a problem among the native American and Hispanic population.

References

National Register of Historic Places in Valencia County, New Mexico
Houses completed in 1904